The 1998 Afro-Asian Club Championship, was the 11th and the last Afro-Asian Club Championship competition endorsed by the Confederation of African Football (CAF) and Asian Football Confederation (AFC), contested between the winners of the CAF Champions League and the Asian Club Championship.

The final was contested in two-legged home-and-away format between Korean team Pohang Steelers the 1997–98 Asian Club Championship winner, and the Moroccan side Raja CA, the 1997 CAF Champions League winner, The first leg was hosted by Pohang Steelers at the Pohang Steel Yard in Pohang in November 1998, while the second leg was hosted by Raja CA at Stade Mohamed V in Casablanca in December 1998.

Aggregate was 3–2 for Raja CA.

Teams

Winner

References

External links

Afro-Asian Club Championship
Confederation of African Football club competitions
Asian Football Confederation